In mathematics, in the representation theory of algebraic groups, an observable subgroup is an algebraic subgroup of a linear algebraic group whose every finite-dimensional rational representation arises as the restriction to the subgroup of a finite-dimensional rational representation of the whole group.

An equivalent formulation, in case the base field is closed, is that K is an observable subgroup of G if and only if the quotient variety G/K is a quasi-affine variety.

Some basic facts about observable subgroups:

 Every normal algebraic subgroup of an algebraic group is observable.
 Every observable subgroup of an observable subgroup is observable.

External links
 Extensions of Representations of algebraic linear groups

Representation theory of algebraic groups